There are over a dozen lakes named Mud Lake within the U.S. state of Florida.

 Mud Lake, Collier County, Florida.	
 Mud Lake, Flagler County, Florida.	
 Mud Lake, Hardee County, Florida.	
 Mud Lake, Highlands County, Florida.	 (See Mud Lake (Highlands County, Florida)
 Mud Lake, Hillsborough County, Florida.	
 Mud Lake, Lake County, Florida.	
 Mud Lake, Manatee County, Florida.	
 Mud Lake, Marion County, Florida.	
 Mud Lake, Monroe County, Florida.	
 Mud Lake, Orange County, Florida.	
 Mud Lake, Orange County, Florida.	
 Mud Lake, Orange County, Florida.	
 Mud Lake, Orange County, Florida.	
 Lake Geneva, also known as Mud Lake, Pasco County, Florida.	
 Mud Lake, Pasco County, Florida.	
 Mud Lake, Pasco County, Florida.	
 Mud Lake, Polk County, Florida.	
 Mud Lake, Polk County, Florida.	
 Mud Lake, Putnam County, Florida.	
 Mud Lake, Sumter County, Florida.	
 Mud Lake, Sumter County, Florida.	
 Mud Lake, Taylor County, Florida.	
 Mud Lake, Volusia County, Florida.	
 Tick Island Mud Lake, also known as Mud Lake, Volusia County, Florida.

References
 USGS-U.S. Board on Geographic Names

Lakes of Florida